Kilimatinde is a village in the Singida region of Tanzania, that began as a German colonial fortress.

References

Populated places in Singida Region